Linguonym (from  / language, and  / name), also known as glossonym (from  / language) or glottonym (from Attic Greek: γλῶττα / language), is a linguistic term that designates a proper name of an individual language, or a language family. The study of language names is known as linguonymy (glossonymy, glottonymy), or linguonymics (glossonymics, glottonymics). As a distinctive linguistic discipline, linguonymic studies are closely related to some other onomastic disciplines, particularly those that are focused on the study of ethnonyms (names of ethnic groups) and choronyms (names of regions and countries). In that context, the field is related to ethnolinguistic and sociolinguistic studies. Various questions related to the study of formation and use of language names are also relevant for several other disciplines within social sciences and humanities. 

The term linguonym was introduced to the linguistic terminology in the second half of the 20th century, first in 1973, and again in 1977, while further attempts to define the field were made in 1979. Three synonymic terms (linguonym, glossonym, glottonym) gradually came into use, primarily among linguists and other scholars, but the field of linguonymic studies itself is still considered to be in its formative stages.

Typology

Language names can be classified by several criteria. According to origin, they can be divided into two groups:
 Endonymic language names, known as endolinguonyms (autolinguonyms), endoglossonyms (autoglossonyms) or endoglottonyms (autoglottonyms) represent language names of endonymic (native) origin, created and used by native speakers as designations for their languages. For example, term Deutsch is an endolinguonym (native name) for the language that is called German in English.
 Exonymic language names, known as exolinguonyms (exoglossonyms/alloglossonyms, exoglottonyms/alloglottonyms) represent language names of exonymic (foreign) origin, created and used by those who are not native speakers of the referred languages. For example, term German is an exolinguonym (foreign name), used in English language as a designation for the language that is called Deutsch by its native speakers.

Related terms
In recent years, some authors have tried to introduce the term "logonym" as an alternative designation for the same onomastic class, that encompasses the names of languages, thus avoiding the use of already accepted terms (linguonym, glossonym, glottonym), but those attempts were challenged by the very polysemic nature of the proposed term (logonym), that has several meanings, spanning across different fields of study. As a consequence, the proposed use was treated with caution, and did not gain acceptance.

Searching for appropriate onomastic terms for some other classes of proper names, several researchers have tried to use term linguonym (glossonym, glottonym) as a designation not for the names of languages, but for a specific class of anthroponyms (proper names of humans, individual and collective) that are given to the groups of speakers of any particular language. Some of those attempts were made as a result of misunderstanding, by referencing to official UNESCO documents, that used those terms in their proper meaning, as designations for language names, thus revealing the lack of bases for the proposed alternative uses. Other attempts were made without any referencing, or addressing the issue of the proper meanings and uses of the terms. 

In the same time, the question of defining an appropriate anthroponomastic term for the specific class of proper names that are given to groups of speakers of any particular language (names such as: Anglophones / speakers of English, or Francophones / speakers of French), remained opened and focused on several available solutions that would combine classical terms for speakers or speaking (based on Latin verb loquor, loqui, locutus) with standard suffix -onym, thus producing the term loquonym. Such issues, related to proper formation and use of onomastic terms, have gained importance in scholarly circles, since international surveys among experts revealed the existence of several challenging issues related to the process of terminological standardization within the field.

See also
 List of language names

References

Sources

External links
 Coby Lubliner (2006): Adventures in Glossonymy

Language naming
Onomastics